Kamissoko is a surname. Notable people with the surname include:

Aminata Kamissoko (born 1985), Mauritanian sprinter
Biagui Kamissoko (born 1983), French footballer
Fousseny Kamissoko (born 1983), Equatoguinean footballer
Mamadou Kamissoko (born 1993), French footballer
Ousmane Kamissoko, Malian footballer